Wang Shanshan (born 27 January 1990) is a Chinese association football player who plays for Chinese Women's Super League club Tianjin Tengde.

International career
Wang played at the 2011 Summer Universiade. She made her senior team debut in March 2012 against Germany. In April 2015, she scored in China's 2–1 friendly defeat to England.

At the 2018 Asian Games, she scored 9 goals against Tajikistan after appearing as a 56th-minute substitute.

To date, she has scored 55 goals in 146 appearances.

Style of play
Wang can play in many positions, much like Ruud Gullit, but she mainly plays as a striker. Coach Hao Wei took advantage of her all-roundedness at the 2015 FIFA Women's World Cup, playing her both in defence and attack.

International goals

See also
 List of women's footballers with 100 or more caps

References

External links
 

1990 births
Living people
Chinese women's footballers
China women's international footballers
2015 FIFA Women's World Cup players
Footballers at the 2016 Summer Olympics
Women's association football defenders
Footballers from Henan
Sportspeople from Luoyang
Footballers at the 2014 Asian Games
Olympic footballers of China
Footballers at the 2018 Asian Games
Asian Games silver medalists for China
Asian Games medalists in football
Medalists at the 2018 Asian Games
Universiade gold medalists for China
Universiade medalists in football
2019 FIFA Women's World Cup players
FIFA Century Club
Medalists at the 2011 Summer Universiade
Footballers at the 2020 Summer Olympics